Lloyd Matthews is a former politician in Newfoundland. He represented St. John's North in the Newfoundland House of Assembly from 1993 to 2003.

He was born in St. John's, Newfoundland and Labrador. Matthews married Jean Tremblett. He worked as an auditor for Revenue Canada. In 1993, he founded the Matthews Group of Companies. Matthews was a member of the Board of Trade. He was founding chair of the Children's Wish Foundation of Canada in Newfoundland and St. John's Clean and Beautiful.

Matthews was first elected to the Newfoundland assembly in 1993. He served in the provincial cabinet as Minister of Health, as Minister of Works, services and Transportation, as Minister of Municipal and Provincial Affairs, as Minister of Finance and as Minister of Mines and Energy. In February 2003, he announced that he would not be running for reelection later that year.

References 

Liberal Party of Newfoundland and Labrador MHAs
Members of the Executive Council of Newfoundland and Labrador
Living people
Politicians from St. John's, Newfoundland and Labrador
Year of birth missing (living people)
21st-century Canadian politicians